Ryan Patrick O'Rourke (born April 30, 1988) is a college baseball coach and former American professional baseball pitcher. He is the volunteer assistant and pitching coach at the College of the Holy Cross. He played college baseball at Merrimack College from 2007 to 2010. O'Rourke was drafted by the Minnesota Twins in the 13th round of the 2010 Major League Baseball Draft and made his Major League Baseball (MLB) debut in 2015. He has previously played in Major League Baseball (MLB) for the Minnesota Twins and New York Mets.

Early life
O'Rourke was raised in Worcester, Massachusetts and attended  St. John's High School in Shrewsbury where he played on the baseball team. He graduated in 2006. His brother Colin was an All-American lacrosse player for St. John's and played lacrosse for Wagner College.  After high school, he attended Merrimack College. Where he broke all of the schools pitching records. During the summer of 2008 O'Rourke played for the Brockport Riverbats in the NYCBL. His 6-1 record helped lead the Riverbats to the league championship.

Career

Minnesota Twins
O'Rourke was drafted by the Minnesota Twins in the 13th round of the 2010 Major League Baseball Draft out of Merrimack College. O'Rourke was called up to the majors for the first time on July 7, 2015, and made his major league debut that day in a win over the Baltimore Orioles. After numerous callups, he finished with a 6.14 ERA in 28 games, giving up 15 walks in 22 innings, for the Twins. 

He began the 2016 season in the minors. He finished 0-1 with a 3.96 ERA in 26 games for the Twins. He is starting the 2017 season on the disabled list. 

He was outrighted to AAA on November 6, 2017. He elected free agency on November 6, 2017.

Baltimore Orioles
On November 16, 2017, O'Rourke signed a minor league deal with the Baltimore Orioles. He elected free agency on November 3, 2018.

New York Mets
On November 15, 2018, O’Rourke signed a minor league deal with the New York Mets and was invited to spring training. O’Rourke has his contract selected to the major leagues on May 1, 2019. On June 26, he was designated for assignment.

Minnesota Twins (second stint)
On August 9, 2019, O’Rourke signed a minor league deal with the Minnesota Twins. He became a free agent following the 2019 season. On June 8, 2020, O’Rourke officially announced his retirement on Twitter.

International career
In 2019, O'Rourke became a citizen of Ireland via his grandparents. In July 2019, he pitched for the Irish national baseball team during the qualifiers for the 2019 European Baseball Championship.

Coaching career
On February 20, 2020, O'Rourke retired and joined the coaching staff of Holy Cross as a volunteer assistant.

References

External links

1988 births
Living people
Águilas Cibaeñas players
American expatriate baseball players in the Dominican Republic
Águilas del Zulia players
American expatriate baseball players in Venezuela
Baseball players from Worcester, Massachusetts
Beloit Snappers players
Bravos de Margarita players
Cangrejeros de Santurce (baseball) players
Chattanooga Lookouts players
Criollos de Caguas players
Elizabethton Twins players
Fort Myers Miracle players
Major League Baseball pitchers
Merrimack Warriors baseball players
Minnesota Twins players
New Britain Rock Cats players
New York Mets players
Rochester Red Wings players
Gulf Coast Orioles players
Aberdeen IronBirds players
Frederick Keys players
Norfolk Tides players
Syracuse Mets players
Holy Cross Crusaders baseball coaches
Liga de Béisbol Profesional Roberto Clemente pitchers